Aglaé (other form: Aglaë) is a French female given name. Notable people with the name include:

 Charlotte Aglaé d'Orléans (1700-1761), French noblewoman
 Aglaé de Polignac (1768–1803), French noblewoman
 Aglaé Cadet ( 1738–1801), French enamelist and painter
 Aglaé Joséphine Savatier, birth name of Apollonie Sabatier (1822–1890), French courtesan, salon holder, artists' muse, and bohemian

References

French feminine given names